Shinar (Hebrew  , Septuagint  ) is the name for the southern region of Mesopotamia used by the Hebrew Bible.

Etymology
Hebrew שנער Šinʿar is equivalent to the Egyptian Sngr and Hittite Šanḫar(a), all referring to southern Mesopotamia. Some Assyriologists considered Šinʿar a western variant or cognate of Šumer (Sumer), with their original being the Sumerians' own name for their country, ki-en-gi(-r), but this is "beset with philological difficulties". 

Sayce (1895) identified Shinar as cognate with the following names: Sangara/Sangar mentioned in the context of the Asiatic conquests of Thutmose III (15th century BCE); Sanhar/Sankhar of the Amarna letters (14th century BCE); the Greeks' Singara; and modern Sinjar, in Upper Mesopotamia, near the Khabur River. Accordingly, he proposed that Shinar was in Upper Mesopotamia, but acknowledged that the Bible gives important evidence that it was in the south.
Albright (1924) suggested identification with the Kingdom of Khana.

Hebrew Bible
The name Šinʿar occurs eight times in the Hebrew Bible, in which it refers to Babylonia. This location of Shinar is evident from its description as encompassing both Babel/Babylon (in northern Babylonia) and Erech/Uruk (in southern Babylonia). In the Book of Genesis 10:10, the beginning of Nimrod's kingdom is said to have been "Babel [Babylon], and Erech [Uruk], and Akkad, and Calneh, in the land of Shinar." Verse 11:2 states that Shinar enclosed the plain that became the site of the Tower of Babel after the Great Flood. After the Flood, the sons of Shem, Ham, and Japheth stayed first in the highlands of Armenia and then migrated to Shinar.

In Genesis 14:1,9, King Amraphel rules Shinar. Shinar is further mentioned in Joshua 7:21; Isaiah 11:11; Daniel 1:2; and Zechariah 5:11, as a general synonym for Babylonia.

Jubilees
The Book of Jubilees 9:3 allots Shinar (or, in the Ethiopic text, Sadna Sena`or) to Ashur, son of Shem. Jubilees 10:20 states that the Tower of Babel was built with bitumen from the sea of Shinar. David Rohl theorized that the Tower was actually located in Eridu, which was once located on the coast of the Persian Gulf, where there are ruins of a massive, ancient ziggurat worked from bitumen.

References

Upper Mesopotamia
Sumer
Torah places
Noach (parashah)
Nimrod
Book of Jubilees